Pima parkerella is a species of snout moth. It is found in North America, including Montana.

References

Moths described in 1924
Phycitini
Pima (moth)